The Blink-182 and Lil Wayne Tour was a co-headlining concert tour by American rock band Blink-182 and American rapper Lil Wayne. The tour was in support of the group's eighth studio album, Nine, as well as Wayne's previously released twelfth studio album, Tha Carter V (2018). The tour began on June 29 in Hartford, Connecticut and concluded on September 16, 2019 in Cincinnati, Ohio. One date coincided with Blink-182's appearance on the Vans Warped Tour 25th anniversary reunion show, as well as at 2019's Riot Fest. Welsh punk group Neck Deep was the opening act on the tour. It was the band's last tour with guitarist/vocalist Matt Skiba before his departure in 2022 upon original member Tom DeLonge's return.

To promote and announce the tour, Blink-182 and Lil Wayne released live and studio mashups of their songs "What's My Age Again?" and "A Milli". One month after first publicizing the tour, Blink-182 also announced they would perform their 1999 album Enema of the State in full at all shows, in addition to their hit singles and new music.

Set list

blink-182
This set list is from the concert on June 29, 2019 in Hartford. It is not intended to represent all shows from the tour

"Dumpweed"
"Don’t Leave Me"
"Aliens Exist"
"Going Away to College"
"What's My Age Again?"
"Dysentery Gary"
"Adam's Song"
"All The Small Things"
"The Party Song"
"Mutt"
"Wendy Clear"
"Anthem"
"Down" (acoustic)
"Wasting Time" (acoustic)
"Family Reunion"
"Feeling This"
"Bored To Death"
"Built This Pool"
"I Miss You"
"Cynical"
"Blame It On My Youth"
"First Date"
"Generational Divide"
"Dammit"

Tour dates

Box score data

Canceled shows

Reception

Ticket sales to the tour were low. Three weeks prior to the opening date of the tour, Rolling Stone contributor Andy Greene observed that "A quick glance at Ticketmaster shows oceans of unsold tickets at many shows with seats even in the back of the pavilion going for over $100 in certain markets." As "ticket sales flagged," Live Nation rebranded the tour as a twentieth anniversary celebration of Enema of the State, Blink's seminal 1999 album. Spencer Kornhaber at The Atlantic opined that it "seemed like a bid to lure the masses," while Greene noted, "In all likelihood, this move was designed to help move tickets that were probably priced a little too high to begin with." Star Tribune writer Chris Riemenschneider wrote that discount tickets were heavily promoted on Groupon, and noted that his city's venue moved fans with tickets to closer levels to the stage to account for the unused seats.

In addition to the sales, Wayne did not perform at several of the tour's shows. He nearly quit the tour only nine shows in, at the stop in Bristow, Virginia. He stopped his set four songs in, complained of the crowd size, and remarked that it may be his last night on tour. The next day he clarified on Twitter he would not be leaving: "I'm having too much fun with my bros blink-182." He later also skipped the Tampa date due to illness, the Irvine, California concert for "unforeseen circumstances", and a stop St. Louis after a run-in with the authorities. Mike Walters of TheBlast News reported that "One source pointed out that all [three] times he bailed, it was on a venue that guaranteed a smaller crowd than his usual stadium or arena performances, and our sources believe the rapper is intentionally skipping out on the smaller crowds."

Reviews of the tour have been positive. Scott Mervis for the Pittsburgh Post-Gazette found Blink "still a force of nature in a bold, flashy show with pyro, smoke jets and a spinning drum contraption for Barker to solo with backing tracks." Jillian Atelsek, reviewing their performance at Hersheypark Stadium for The Patriot-News, singled out Wayne's set as "more than just a prelude to blink-182's. It felt complete and impressive in its own right." NJ.com's Bobby Olivier dubbed the combination "summer's oddest couple," but also "electrifying". In contrast, Chris Kelly at The Washington Post bemoaned both acts' "road-weary antics," remarking that "nobody on stage seemed to be having fun." Riemenschneider of the Star Tribune stated the tour did not have a "good buzz," remarking that it might "have been a big hit as a frat party circa 2005."

El Paso shooting
The band were scheduled to perform at Don Haskins Center in El Paso, Texas on August 4, 2019, but the show was postponed following a mass shooting at a local Walmart store the day prior. The band announced the show was delayed "in solidarity with the community [...] Sending our love to the entire community of El Paso." Blink bassist Mark Hoppus tweeted that he was en route to El Paso's Cielo Vista Mall, which was near the Walmart where the shooting took place, when his security team texted him regarding the situation. Following that, the band were "locked down" in their hotel rooms. Lil Wayne was never booked for the show, as he had a prior commitment with Lollapalooza in Chicago. El Paso radio station KSII later reported that LiveNation, the promoter of the tour, announced that the date would not be rescheduled.

Hoppus later addressed the El Paso cancellation on Instagram:

References

Notes

Citations

2019 concert tours
Blink-182 concert tours
Co-headlining concert tours
Lil Wayne